In antiquity, several theses were elaborated on the origin of the Etruscans from the 5th century BC, when the Etruscan civilization had been already established for several centuries in its territories, that can be summarized into three main hypotheses. The first is the autochthonous development in situ out of the Villanovan culture, as claimed by the Greek historian Dionysius of Halicarnassus who described the Etruscans as indigenous people who had always lived in Etruria. The second is a migration from the Aegean sea, as claimed by two Greek historians: Herodotus, who described them as a group of immigrants from Lydia in Anatolia, and Hellanicus of Lesbos who claimed that the Tyrrhenians were the Pelasgians originally from Thessaly, Greece, who entered Italy at the head of the Adriatic sea in Northern Italy. The third hypotheses was reported by Livy and Pliny the Elder, and puts the Etruscans in the context of the Rhaetian people to the north and other populations living in the Alps. The first Greek author to mention the Etruscans, whom the Ancient Greeks called Tyrrhenians, was the 8th-century BC poet Hesiod, in his work, the Theogony. He mentioned them as residing in central Italy alongside the Latins. The 7th-century BC Homeric Hymn to Dionysus referred to them as pirates. Unlike later Greek authors, such as Herodotus and Hellanicus, these earlier Greek authors did not suggest that Etruscans had migrated to Italy from elsewhere.

According to prehistoric and protohistoric archaeologists, anthropologists, etruscologists, geneticists, linguists, all the evidence gathered so far points to an autochthonous origin of the Etruscans. Moreover, there is no archeological evidence for a migration of the Lydians or the Pelasgians into Etruria. It was only in the 5th century BC, when the Etruscan civilization had been established for several centuries, that Greek writers started associating the name "Tyrrhenians" with the "Pelasgians" or the "Lydians". There is consensus among modern scholars that these Greek tales are not based on real events. The earliest evidence of a culture that is identifiably Etruscan dates from about 900 BC: this is the period of the Iron Age Villanovan culture, considered to be the earliest phase of Etruscan civilization, which itself developed from the previous late Bronze Age Proto-Villanovan culture in the same region, part of the central European Urnfield culture system.

Helmut Rix's classification of the Etruscan language in the Tyrsenian language family reflects the ambiguity of the stories about their origins. Rix finds Etruscan on the one hand genetically related to the Rhaetic language spoken in the Alps north of Etruria, suggesting autochthonous connections, but on the other hand he notes that the Lemnian language found on the "Lemnos stele" is closely related to Etruscan, entailing either Etruscan presence in "Tyrsenian" Lemnos, or "Tyrsenian" expansion westward to Etruria. After more than 90 years of archaeological excavations at Lemnos, nothing has been found that would support a migration from Lemnos to Etruria, the indigenous inhabitants of Lemnos, also called in ancient times Sinteis, were the Sintians, a Thracian population. Some scholars believe the Lemnian language might have arrived in the Aegean Sea during the Late Bronze Age, when Mycenaean rulers recruited groups of mercenaries from Sicily, Sardinia and various parts of the Italian peninsula. Other scholars have concluded that the Lemnian inscriptions might be due to an Etruscan commercial settlement on the island that took place before 700 BC, not related to the Sea Peoples.

An mtDNA study published in 2013 concluded that the Etruscans' mtDNA appears very similar to that of Neolithic population from Central Europe and to other Tuscan populations. This coincides with the Rhaetic language, which was spoken south and north of the Alps in the area of the Urnfield culture of Central Europe. The Villanovan culture, the early period of the Etruscan civilization, derives from the Proto-Villanovan culture that branched from the Urnfield culture around 1200 BC. An autochthonous population that diverged genetically was previously suggested as a possibility by Cavalli-Sforza.

A 2019 genetic study by Stanford, published in the journal Science, which analyzed the autosomal DNA of 11 Iron Age samples from the areas around Rome, concluded that Etruscans (900-600 BC) and the Latins (900-200 BC) from Latium vetus were genetically similar, and Etruscans also had Steppe-related ancestry despite speaking a pre-Indo-European language.

A 2021 genetic study by Max Planck Institute, Universities of Tübingen, Florence, and Harvard, published in the journal Science Advances, analyzed the autosomal DNA of 48 Iron Age individuals from Tuscany and Lazio and confirmed that the Etruscan individuals displayed the ancestral component Steppe in the same percentages as found in the previously analyzed Iron Age Latins, and that the Etruscans' DNA completely lacks a signal of recent admixture with Anatolia or the Eastern Mediterranean, concluding that the Etruscans were autochthonous and they had a genetic profile similar to their Latin neighbors. Both Etruscans and Latins joined firmly the European cluster, 75% of the Etruscan male individuals were found to belong to haplogroup R1b, especially R1b-P312 and its derivative R1b-L2 whose direct ancestor is R1b-U152, while the most common mitochondrial DNA haplogroup among the Etruscans was H.

Historical claims of autochthonous (indigenous) origin

Dionysius of Halicarnassus asserted:

With this passage, Dionysius launched the autochthonous theory, that the core element of the Etruscans, who spoke the Etruscan language, were of "Terra (Earth) itself"; that is, on location for so long that they appeared to be the original or native inhabitants. They are therefore the owners of the Villanovan culture.

Picking up this theme, Bonfante (2002) states:

An additional elaboration conjectures that the Etruscans were

In 1942, the Italian historian Massimo Pallottino published a book entitled The Etruscans (which would be released in English in 1955). Pallottino presented various hypotheses that gained wide acceptance in the archeological community. He said "no one would dream of asking where Italians or Frenchmen came from originally; it is the formation of the Italian and French nations that we study." He meant that the formation process for Etruscan civilization took place in Etruria or nearby. Formulating a different point of view on the same evidence, Pallottino says:

J. P. Mallory compares the Etruscans to other remnant non Indo-European central Mediterranean populations, such as the Basques of the Iberian Peninsula and southern France, who absorbed the art styles and alphabet of their Greek neighbors.

The British archaeologists, Graeme Barker and Tom Rasmussen, were also fervent supporters of the "autochthonous theory". In their book, The Etruscans, they state, "There is no evidence for the kind of cultural break at the Villanovan/Etruscan transition envisaged by either of the ‘plantation’ models from the eastern Mediterranean, or for a folk movement of either kind from continental Europe in the Late Bronze Age,". Thus, inferring that the Etruscans were indigenous to Italy and descended from the later communities of Etruria.

Many supporters of this theory also believed that the Etruscans had foreign influences on their culture. For instance, the historian, Mario Torelli agreed with Dionysius’s claims and believed that the Etruscans inherited elements of their culture from other Italic peoples. Robert Leighton also agreed with the “autochthonous theory”, but he believed the Etruscan's culture was impacted by Greek and Phoenician merchants.

Historical claims of allochthonous (outside) origin

In Greco-Roman mythology, Aeneas (Greek: Αἰνείας, Aineías) was a Trojan hero, the son of prince Anchises and the goddess Venus. His father was also the second cousin of King Priam of Troy. The journey of Aeneas from Troy (led by Venus, his mother), which led to the founding of the city of Rome, is recounted in Virgil's Aeneid, where the historicity of the Aeneas legend is employed to flatter the Emperor Augustus. Romulus and Remus, appearing in Roman mythology as the traditional founders of Rome, were of Eastern origin: their grandfather Numitor and his brother Amulius were alleged to be descendants of fugitives from Troy.

Herodotus reports the Lydians' claim that the Etruscans came from Lydia in Asia Minor (i.e. Anatolia):

Since ancient times, doubts have been raised about the accuracy of Herodotus' claims. Xanthus of Lydia, originally from Sardis and a great connoisseur of the history of the Lydians, wasn't aware of a Lydian origin of the Etruscans, as reported by Greek historian Dionysius of Halicarnassus.

The classical scholar Michael Grant commented on this story, writing that it "is based on erroneous etymologies, like many other traditions about the origins of 'fringe' peoples of the Greek world". Grant writes there is evidence that the Etruscans themselves spread it to make their trading easier in Asia Minor when many cities in Asia Minor, and the Etruscans themselves, were at war with the Greeks.

The French scholar Dominique Briquel also disputed the historical validity of Herodotus' account. Briquel demonstrated that "the story of an exodus from Lydia to Italy was a deliberate political fabrication created in the Hellenized milieu of the court at Sardis in the early 6th century BC." Briquel also commented that "the traditions handed down from the Greek authors on the origins of the Etruscan people are only the expression of the image that Etruscans' allies or adversaries wanted to divulge. For no reason, stories of this kind should be considered historical documents".

However, the Greek historian Dionysius of Halicarnassus objected that the Tyrrhenian (Etruscan) culture and language shared nothing with the Lydian. He stated:

"Sea peoples"

The Etruscans or Tyrrhenians may have been one of the sea peoples of the 14th–13th century BC, if Massimo Pallottino's assimilation of the Teresh of Egyptian inscriptions with Tyrrhenoi is correct. There is no further evidence to connect the Sea Peoples to the Etruscans: the Etruscan autonym Rasna, does not lend itself to the Tyrrhenian derivation.

Neither the Etruscan material culture or language has provided scholars with conclusive evidence regarding the Etruscans' origins. The language, which has been partly deciphered, has variants and representatives in inscriptions on Lemnos, in the Aegean, but these may have been created by travellers or Etruscan colonists, during the period before Rome destroyed Etruscan political and military power.

During the 6th to 5th centuries BC, the word "Tyrrhenians" was referred specifically to the Etruscans, for whom the Tyrrhenian Sea is named, according to Strabo. In Pindar, the Tyrsenoi appear grouped with the Carthaginians as a threat to Magna Graecia:

Thucydides mentions them together with the Pelasgians and associates them with Lemnian pirates and with the pre-Greek population of Attica. Lemnos remained relatively free of Greek influence up to Hellenistic times, and the Lemnos stele of the 6th century BC is inscribed with a language very similar to Etruscan. This has led to the postulation of a "Tyrrhenian language group" comprising Etruscan, Lemnian and Raetic. There is thus linguistic evidence of a relationship between the Lemnians and the Etruscans. Some scholars ascribe this link to Etruscan expansion between the 8th and 6th centuries BC, putting the homeland of the Etruscans in Italy and the Alps particularly because of their relation to the Alpine Raetic population. Adherents of this latter school of thought point to the legend of Lydian origin of the Etruscans referred to by Herodotus, and the statement of Livy that the Raetians were Etruscans driven into the mountains by the invading Gauls. Critics of this theory point to the very scanty evidence of a linguistic relationship of Etruscan with Indo-European, let alone Anatolian in particular, and to Dionysius of Halicarnassus who decidedly argues against an Etruscan-Lydian relationship. The Indo-European Lydian language is first attested some time after the Tyrrhenian migrants are said to have left for Italy.

Differentiating between cultural origin and cultural influence
The origin of the civilization of Etruria is an ancient debate, because the terms in which historians have opened and contested theories have relied on out-dated conceptions of origin and culture. The last two millennia of raising inconclusive theories towards a definitive location for the origins of Etruria has led modern scholarship to diverge from traditional approaches to national origins and instead focus on the development of concepts, such as national origin and cultural formation, differentiating between cultural influence and cultural origin.

The initial sources of inquiry for historians studying Etruscan origins are the classical sources provided by ancient scholars such as Herodotus and Dionysius. These writers were naturally interested in where such an advanced civilization originated. Herodotus initiated the Lydian theory which told the story of Etruscan origins as a mass migration from Lydia, led by King Tyrsenos, a migration due to the famine experienced shortly after the Trojan War. Larissa Bonfante argues that the traditional concept of origin that classical Greek writers subscribed to "had to be explained as the result of a migration, under the leadership of a mythical founding hero".

The second key hypothesis was launched by the Augustan historian, Dionysius of Halicarnassus. Being aware that his predecessors were "unanimous in stating that the Etruscans came from the East" he expressed an alternate hypothesis that the Etruscans were "native to the country", and by doing so opened the autochthonous theory. Scholarship has questioned why ancient sources appear "unanimous" towards an Anatolian origin. Bonfante suggests that it is the natural response for Greek writers to connect other civilizations accomplishments to "Greek heroes" in an attempt to promote a "glorified national narrative". On the other hand R.S.P. Beekes argues that these ancient writers, especially Herodotus, found the famine in Lydia an obvious connection to the migration to Etruria, rather than a debatable area of discussion. The autochthonous theory that Dionysius instigated was a view held by Etruscans themselves, whom he consulted, though how much these Etruscans knew about their own origins is questionable.

The reason modern scholarship, such as John Bryan Perkins, sceptically uses ancient sources as evidence to support an argument, is because these sources generally promote a national image and harbour political prejudices. He argues that the ancient interpretation of Etruscan origins has derived from a "hostile tradition, of rivals and enemies; the Greeks and Romans". The extent of "classical prejudice" is exemplified in early records of the Etruscans. Classical literature typically portrayed Etruscans as 'pirates' and 'freebooters'. Massimo Pallottino points out that their reputation for piracy took shape between the time of Homer and the image shown in the Homeric Hymns, and was clearly a product of the intense commercial and territorial rivalry between the Etruscans and Greek traders. Consequentially Perkins concludes that ancient "standards of historical criticism were not ours" in which "a great deal of it is seen through a veil of interpretation, misunderstanding, and at times, plain invention". The ancient tendency to invent or apply a fabricated account within their historical record is evident in Herodotus' Histories. His use of fanciful story telling contributes to the overarching glorified narrative of Greece in the Persian wars and exemplifies the greatness of Greek conquest. This agenda is problematic when viewing his 'heroic' understanding of Etruscan origins, because Herodotus' stories tend to contribute to the national narrative rather than an intended historical record. His account is seen through, what Perkins refers to as, antiquity's "distorting mirror".

In the 1950s, Professor Pallottino resurrected the initial autochthonous theory and by doing so contended with traditional scholarship that has "remained fixated on the idea that the origins of the Italic people were to be found in the effects of immigration from outside". The argument has been developed on the basis that the Etruscan culture appears unique to any other known prehistoric culture, therefore must have developed nowhere else but within Italy". He admits to foreign contributions to the cultural development of the Etruscans, however, he maintains that the mixture of culture took place on Italian soil; the "parent stock" was sufficiently homogeneous and therefore of Italian origin. Indigenous arguments are based on the unique attributes of Etruscan culture, believing that it is an "evolutionary sequence" in which Etruria developed its independent culture, a "formative process of the Etruscan which can only take place on the territory of Etruria itself". Nevertheless, to subscribe to this thesis a problem arises; Etruscan culture was "no doubt in itself a unique and developing phenomenon", however, this culture has been compounded of and developed from other earlier cultural strains. The question remains whether these strains were dominant in the finished product; it is difficult to differentiate between a product of a foreign culture and an independent culture with foreign influences. Other historical methodologies, such as linguistics, archaeology and DNA research, have attempted to clarify this distinction and highlight the extent of foreign influence in Etruscan culture.

Linguists have attempted to shed light on the degree of foreign influence on the Etruscan civilization. R.S.P. Beekes places reliance on his linguistic analysis of the Lemnian inscriptions, which he believes "provided the answer to the problem of the origins of the Etruscans". The Lemnos stele is a sixth-century stele in a pre-Hellenic tongue found in Lemnos, a Northern Greek island. The inscription shows distinct similarities to the Etruscan language; both languages apply a similar four vowel system, grammar and vocabulary. Beekes argues that autochthonous theories are merely "a desperate attempt to avoid the evident conclusion from the Lemnian inscription". He does not suggest that the language shaped the Etruscan culture, but rather that the similarities in the two languages proves that the Etruscans migrated from Asia Minor, as Herodotus suggested.

Alison E. Cooley criticises Beekes' assumption that the Eastern features found in the etymological research of the Lemnian inscription "simply settles the question", yet she imposes that the "later Eastern attributes of the Etruscan is often a product of acculturation". Cooley in contrary to Beekes argues that the similarities in the languages are a result of contact with Greek and Lydian civilization due to commercial trade.

Linguists, such as Beekes, are commonly criticised for the assumption that "because they speak a common language, they must belong to the same race". However, recently linguists such as Kari Gibson have argued that language is the predominant factor in the cultural formation of a national identity and therefore cannot be discarded as an independent attribute of a cultural identity, but rather the framework through which such a civilization functions. Gibson suggests that language is inextricably linked to national and cultural identity of the speaker, and as a "powerful symbol of national and ethnic identity" determines an individual's perception of their environment. To place this argument in the linguistic debate of Etruscan origins, modern scholars such as Cooley are perhaps being overly dismissive of the impact of language on the development of the Etruscan identity; "Ethnic identity is twin skin to linguistic identity". It is difficult for scholarship to evaluate the degree of influence the Lydian language would have had on the cultural development of Etruria, though language is undeniably a key ingredient in the development of Etruscan culture.

Archaeology has a prominent role in revealing aspects of Etruscan daily life and the social structure of such a sophisticated civilization, thus exposing foreign influences. The most significant archaeological discoveries of Etruscan civilization are found in the excavation of gravesites. Bonfante emphasises the unique cultural elements the funerary frescoes in these gravesites illustrate. The well preserved frescoes of the funerary chambers found in the necropolis of Monterozzi, situated on a ridge southeast of the ancient city of Tarquinia, are vital to the reconstruction of Etruscan culture. Scholars of the autochthonous theory tend to draw attention to the frescoes' depiction of women. Material evidence for the high social status of Etruscan women can be found on the frescoes in the Tomb of the Leopards, dating to the 5th century BC. The fresco illustrates women and men conversing together and wearing the same crowns of laurel, which implies that symbols of status in Etruscan society were similar for men and women. This advanced status for women is a unique Etruscan element that is not known from any other culture of its time.

Frescoes found in the Tomb of Hunting and Fishing mark the earliest time where men are not depicted dominating their environment. In the fresco of birds flying over a boat of men, the men are shown to be proportionally smaller than the birds. Pallottino points out that this is a unique attribute from Etruscan artworks, because it provides an insight into how the Etruscans viewed themselves in comparison to their environment. Ancient works dated prior to this fresco tended to view men dominating their environment. However, the Tomb of Hunting and Fishing illustrates men in the background of the work, rather than typically the foreground, suggesting to scholars such as Pallottino that Etruria had developed a culture and social understanding unlike any other prehistoric civilization and therefore cannot be a product of any prior culture.

Archeological evidence and modern etruscology

The question of Etruscan origins has long been a subject of interest and debate among historians. In modern times, all the evidence gathered so far by etruscologists points to an indigenous origin of the Etruscans. Archaeologically there is no evidence for a migration of the Lydians or the Pelasgians into Etruria. Modern etruscologists and archeologists, such as Massimo Pallottino (1947), have shown that early historians’ assumptions and assertions on the subject were groundless. The French etruscologist Dominique Briquel, whose numerous writings were devoted to this subject, explained in detail why he believes that ancient Greek historians’ writings on Etruscan origins should not even count as historical documents. He argues that the ancient story of the Etruscans’ 'Lydian origins' was a deliberate, politically motivated fabrication, and that ancient Greeks inferred a connection between the Tyrrhenians and the Pelasgians solely on the basis of certain Greek and local traditions and on the mere fact that there had been trade between the Etruscans and Greeks. He noted that, even if these stories include historical facts suggesting contact, such contact is more plausibly traceable to cultural exchange than to migration.

Several archaeologists who have analyzed Bronze Age and Iron Age remains that were excavated in the territory of historical Etruria have pointed out that no evidence has been found, related either to material culture or to social practices, that can support a migration theory from the Aegean Sea. The most marked and radical change that has been archaeologically attested in the area is the adoption, starting in about the 12th century BC, of the funeral rite of incineration in terracotta urns, which is a Continental European practice, derived from the Urnfield culture; there is nothing about it that suggests an ethnic contribution from Asia Minor or the Near East. One of the most common mistakes for a long time, even among some scholars of the past, has been to associate the later Orientalizing period of Etruscan civilization, due, as has been amply demonstrated by archeologists, to contacts with the Greeks and the Eastern Mediterranean and not mass migrations, with the question of their origins. The facial features (the profile, almond-shaped eyes, large nose) in the frescoes and sculptures, and the depiction of reddish-brown men and light-skinned women, influenced by archaic Greek art, followed the artistic traditions from the Eastern Mediterranean, that had spread even among the Greeks themselves, and to a lesser extent also to other several civilizations in the central and western Mediterranean up to the Iberian Peninsula. Actually, many of the tombs of the Late Orientalizing and Archaic periods, such as the Tomb of the Augurs, the Tomb of the Triclinium or the Tomb of the Leopards, as well as other tombs from the archaic period in the Monterozzi necropolis in Tarquinia, were painted by Greek painters or, in any case, foreigner artists. These images have, therefore, a very limited value for a realistic representation of the Etruscan population. It was only from the end of the 4th century B.C. that evidence of physiognomic portraits began to be found in Etruscan art and Etruscan portraiture became more realistic.

A 2012 survey of the previous 30 years’ archaeological findings, based on excavations of the major Etruscan cities, showed a continuity of culture from the last phase of the Bronze Age (12th–10th century BC) to the Iron Age (9th–8th century BC). This is evidence that the Etruscan civilization, which emerged around 900 BC, was built by people whose ancestors had inhabited that region for at least the previous 200 years, as has also been confirmed by anthropological and genetic studies. Based on this cultural continuity, there is now a consensus among archeologists that Proto-Etruscan culture developed, during the last phase of the Bronze Age, from the indigenous Proto-Villanovan culture, and that the subsequent Iron Age Villanovan culture is most accurately described as an early phase of the Etruscan civilization. It is possible that there were contacts between northern-central Italy and the Mycenaean world at the end of the Bronze Age. However, contacts between the inhabitants of Etruria and inhabitants of Greece, Aegean Sea Islands, Asia Minor, and the Near East are attested only centuries later, as well as those with the Celtic world, when Etruscan civilization was already flourishing and Etruscan ethnogenesis was well established. The first of these attested contacts relate to the Greek colonies in Southern Italy and the Nuragics and Sardo-Punics in Sardinia, and the consequent orientalizing period.

Genetic evidence

There have been a number of genetic studies of Etruscans and modern Tuscans compared with other populations, some of which indicate the local, European origin of Etruscans and others supportive of an allochthonous origin. In general, the direct testing of ancient Etruscan DNA has supported a deep, local origin, while the testing of modern samples as a proxy for Etruscans is rather inconclusive and inconsistent.

The very large mtDNA study from 2013 indicates, based on maternally-inherited DNA from 30 bone samples taken from tombs dating from the eight century to the first century BC from Tuscany and Lazio, that the Etruscans were a native population. The study extracted and typed the hypervariable region of mitochondrial DNA of 14 individuals buried in two Etruscan necropoleis, analyzing them along with previously analyzed Etruscan mtDNA, other ancient European mtDNA, modern and Medieval samples from Tuscany, and 4,910 modern individuals from the Mediterranean basin. The ancient (30 Etruscans, 27 Medieval Tuscans) and modern DNA sequences (370 Tuscans) were subjected to several million computer simulation runs, showing that the Etruscans can be considered ancestral to Medieval and, especially in the subpopulations from Casentino and Volterra, of modern Tuscans; modern populations from Murlo and Florence, by contrast, were shown not to continue the Medieval population. By further considering two Anatolian samples (35 and 123 individuals), it was estimated that the genetic links between Tuscany and Anatolia date back to at least 5,000 years ago, and the "most likely separation time between Tuscany and Western Anatolia falls around 7,600 years ago", strongly suggesting that the Etruscan culture developed locally, and not as an immediate consequence of immigration from the Eastern Mediterranean shores. According to the study, ancient Etruscan mtDNA is closest among modern European populations and is not particularly close to Anatolian or other Eastern Mediterranean populations. Among ancient populations based on mtDNA, ancient Etruscans were found to be closest to LBK Neolithic farmers from Central Europe.

This result is largely in line with previous mtDNA results from 2004 (in a smaller study also based on ancient DNA), and contradictory to results from 2007 (based on modern DNA). The 2004 study was based on mitochondrial DNA (mtDNA) from 80 bone samples, reduced to 28 bone samples in the analysis phase, taken from tombs dating from the seventh century to the third century BC from Veneto, Tuscany, Lazio and Campania. This study found that the ancient DNA extracted from the Etruscan remains had some affinities with modern European populations including Germans, English people from Cornwall, and Tuscans in Italy. In addition the Etruscan samples possibly revealed more genetic inheritance from the eastern and southern Mediterranean than modern Italian samples contain. The study was marred by concerns that mtDNA sequences from the archeological samples represented severely damaged or contaminated DNA; however, subsequent investigation showed that the samples passed the most stringent tests of DNA degradation available.

A mtDNA study, published in 2018 in the journal American Journal of Physical Anthropology, compared both ancient and modern samples from Tuscany, from the Prehistory, Etruscan age, Roman age, Renaissance, and Present-day, and concluded that the Etruscans appear as a local population, intermediate between the prehistoric and the other samples, placing in the temporal network between the Eneolithic Age and the Roman Age.

A 2019 genetic study published in the journal Science analyzed the remains of eleven Iron Age individuals from the areas around Rome, of which four were Etruscan individuals, one buried in Veio Grotta Gramiccia from the Villanovan period (900-800 BC) and three buried in La Mattonara Necropolis near Civitavecchia from the Orientalizing period (700-600 BC). The study concluded that Etruscans (900–600 BC) and the Latins (900–500 BC) from Latium vetus were genetically similar., genetic differences between the examined Etruscans and Latins were found to be insignificant. The Etruscan individuals and contemporary Latins were distinguished from preceding populations of Italy by the presence of 30.7% steppe ancestry. Their DNA was a mixture of two-thirds Copper Age ancestry (EEF + WHG; Etruscans ~66–72%, Latins ~62–75%) and one-third Steppe-related ancestry (Etruscans ~27–33%, Latins ~24–37%) (with the EEF component mainly deriving from Neolithic-era migrants to Europe from Anatolia and the WHG being local Western European hunter-gatherers, with both components, along with that from the steppe, being found in virtually all European populations). The only sample of Y-DNA extracted belonged to haplogroup J-M12 (J2b-L283), found in an individual dated 700-600 BC, and carried exactly the M314 derived allele also found in a Middle Bronze Age individual from Croatia (1631-1531 calBCE). While the four samples of mtDNA extracted belonged to haplogroups U5a1, H, T2b32, K1a4. Therefore, Etruscans had also Steppe-related ancestry despite speaking a pre-Indo-European language.

A 2021 study by the Max Planck Institute, the Universities of Tübingen, Florence, and Harvard, published in the journal Science Advances, analyzed the Y-chromosome, mitochondrial DNA, and autosomal DNA of 82 ancient samples from Etruria (Tuscany and Latium) and southern Italy (Basilicata) spanning from 800 BC to 1000 AD, including 48 Iron Age individuals. The study confirmed that in the samples of Etruscan individuals from Tuscany and Lazio was present the ancestral component Steppe in the same percentages found in the previously analyzed samples of Iron Age Latins, and added that in the DNA of the Etruscans was completely absent a signal of recent admixture with Anatolia or the Eastern Mediterranean, concluding that the Etruscans were autochthonous and they had a genetic profile similar to that of their early Iron Age Latin neighbors. Both Etruscans and Latins belonged firmly to the European cluster, 75% of the samples of Etruscan male individuals were found to belong to haplogroup R1b, especially R1b-P312 and its derivative R1b-L2 whose direct ancestor is R1b-U152. While regarding mitochondrial DNA haplogroups, the most prevalent was largely H, followed by J and T. Uniparental marker data and autosomal DNA data from samples of Iron Age Etruscan individuals suggest that Etruria received migrations rich of the ancestral Steppe component during the 2nd millennium BC, related to the spread of Indo-European languages, starting with the Bell Beaker culture, and that these migrations merged with populations of the oldest pre-Indo-European layer present since at least the Neolithic period, but it was the latter's language that survived, a situation similar to what happened in the Basque region of northern Spain. The study has also concluded that the samples analyzed show that the Etruscans kept their genetic profile unchanged for almost 1000 years, despite the sparse presence in Etruria of foreigners, and that a demographic change in Etruria occurred only from the Roman imperial period, in which there is the arrival in and intermixture into the local population of ancestral components from the Eastern Mediterranean Sea. Analysis of samples of individuals who lived in the Roman imperial period and those of the Medieval Age also suggest that the genetic landscape of present-day central Italy was formed largely around 1000 years ago after the Barbarian invasions, and that the arrival of the Germanic Lombards in Italy contributed to the formation of the gene pool of the modern population of Tuscany and northern Latium.

An mtDNA study from 2007, by contrast, earlier suggested a Near Eastern origin. Achilli et al. (2007) found in a modern sample of 86 individuals from Murlo, a small town in southern Tuscany, an unusually high frequency (17.5%) of supposed Near Eastern mtDNA haplogroups, while other Tuscan populations do not show the same striking feature. Based on this result Achilli concluded that "their data support the scenario of a post-Neolithic genetic input from the Near East to the present-day population of Tuscany, a scenario in agreement with the Lydian origin of Etruscans". This research has been much criticized by archeologists, etruscologists and classicists. In the absence of any dating evidence, there is no direct link between this genetic input found in Murlo and the Etruscans. Furthermore, there is no evidence that these mtDNA haplogroups found in Murlo might be proof of an eastern origin of the Etruscans, as some of these mtDNA haplogroups have been found in other studies as early as the Neolithic and Aeneolithic in Italy and Germany. All the mtDNA haplogroups found in the modern sample from Murlo and classified by Achilli et al. as of Near Eastern origin are actually widespread in modern samples from other areas of Italy and Europe with no link with the Etruscans.

A recent Y-DNA study from 2018 on a modern sample of 113 individuals from Volterra, a town of Etruscan origin, Grugni at al. keeps all the possibilities open, although the autochthonous scenario is the most supported by numbers, and concludes that "the presence of J2a-M67* (2.7%) suggests contacts by sea with Anatolian people, the finding of the Central European lineage G2a-L497 (7.1%) at considerable frequency would rather support a Northern European origin of Etruscans, while the high incidence of European R1b lineages (R1b 49.8%, R1b-U152 24.5%) cannot rule out the scenario of an autochthonous process of formation of the Etruscan civilization from the preceding Villanovan society, as suggested by Dionysius of Halicarnassus". In Italy Y-DNA J2a-M67*, not yet found in Etruscan samples, is more widespread on the Adriatic Sea coast between Marche and Abruzzo, and not in those where once lived the Etruscans, and in the study has its peak in the Ionian side of Calabria. In 2014, a late Bronze Age Kyjatice culture sample in Hungary was found to be J2a1-M67, a couple of J2a1b were found in Late Neolithic samples from the LBK culture in Austria, a J2a1a was found in a Middle Neolithic Sopot culture sample from Croatia, a J2a was found in a Late Neolithic Lengyel Culture sample from Hungary. In 2019, in a Stanford study published in Science, two ancient samples from the Neolithic settlement of Ripabianca di Monterado in the province of Ancona, in the Marche region of Italy, were found to be Y-DNA J-L26 and J-M304. In 2021, two more ancient samples from the Chalcolitich settlement of Grotta La Sassa, in the province of Latina in southern Lazio, were found to be Y-DNA J2a7-Z2397. Therefore, Y-DNA J2a-M67 is likely in Italy since the Neolithic and can't be the proof of recent contacts with Anatolia.

Recent studies on the population structure of modern-day Italians have shown that in Italy there is a north–south cline for Y-chromosome lineages and autosomal loci, with a clear differentiation of peninsular Italians from Sardinians, and that modern Tuscans are the population of central Italy closest genetically to the inhabitants of northern Italy. A 2019 study, based on autosomal DNA of 1616 individuals from all 20 Italian administrative regions, concludes that Tuscans join the northern Italian cluster, close to the inhabitants of Liguria and Emilia-Romagna. A 2013 study, based on uniparental markers of 884 unrelated individuals from 23 Italian locations, had shown that the structure observed for the paternal lineages in continental Italy and Sicily suggests a shared genetic background between people from Tuscany and Northern Italy from one side, and people from Southern Italy and the Adriatic coast from the other side. The most frequent Y-DNA haplogroups in the group represented by populations from North-Western Italy, including Tuscany and most of the Padana plain, are four R1b-lineages (R-U152*, R-M269*, R-P312* and R-L2*).

In the collective volume Etruscology published in 2017, British archeologist Phil Perkins provides an analysis of the state of DNA studies and writes that "none of the DNA studies to date conclusively prove that Etruscans were an intrusive population in Italy that originated in the Eastern Mediterranean or Anatolia" and "there are indications that the evidence of DNA can support the theory that Etruscan people are autochthonous in central Italy".

In his book A Short History of Humanity published in 2021, German geneticist Johannes Krause, co-director of the Max Planck Institute for Evolutionary Anthropology in Jena, concludes that it is likely that the Etruscan language (as well as Basque, Paleo-Sardinian and Minoan) "developed on the continent in the course of the Neolithic Revolution".

References

Further reading

 Bartoloni, Gilda. The Villanovan culture: at the beginning of Etruscan history. In The Etruscan World, edited by Jean MacIntosh Turfa, 79–98. Abingdon: Routledge, 2013. 
 Becker, Marshall J., Etruscan Skeletal Biology and Etruscan Origins in A Companion to the Etruscans (ed. S. Bell e A. A. Carpino), 2015, pp. 181–202.
 Briquel, Dominique. Etruscan origins and the ancient authors. In The Etruscan World, edited by Jean MacIntosh Turfa, 36–55. Abingdon: Routledge, 2013.
 De Grummond, Nancy T. Ethnicity and the Etruscans. In McInerney, Jeremy (ed.). A Companion to Ethnicity in the Ancient Mediterranean. Chichester, UK: John Wiley & Sons, Inc. pp. 405–422, 2014.
 Drews, Robert, Herodotus 1.94, the Drought Ca. 1200 B.C., and the Origin of the Etruscans, in Historia: Zeitschrift Für Alte Geschichte, vol. 41 no. 1, Stuttgart, Franz Steiner Verlag, 1992, pp. 14–39;
 Gianni, Giovanna Bagnasco. Massimo Pallottino's 'Origins' in perspective. In The Etruscan World, edited by Jean MacIntosh Turfa, 29–35. Abingdon: Routledge, 2013.
 Kron, Geof. Fleshing out the demography of Etruria. In The Etruscan World, edited by Jean MacIntosh Turfa, pp. 56–78. London-New York: Routledge, 2013. 
 Moser, Mary E., The origins of the Etruscans: new evidence for an old question, in John Franklin Hall (a cura di), Etruscan Italy: Etruscan Influences on the Civilizations of Italy from Antiquity to the Modern Era, Provo, Utah: Museum of Art, Brigham Young University, 1996, pp. 29–43
 Perkins, Phil. DNA and Etruscan identity. In Naso, Alessandro (ed.) Etruscology, pp. 109–118. Berlin: De Gruyter, 2017.
 Schiavo, Fulvia Lo. The western Mediterranean before the Etruscans. In The Etruscan World, edited by Jean MacIntosh Turfa, 197–215. Abingdon: Routledge, 2013.
 Turfa, Jean MacIntosh. The Etruscans. In Farney, Gary D.; Bradley, Gary (eds.). The Peoples of Ancient Italy. Berlin: De Gruyter. pp. 637–672, 2017. .

 
Etruscan